Constantia Flexibles is a manufacturer of flexible packaging headquartered in Vienna, Austria. Constantia Flexibles employs around 8,750 people, at approximately 38 production sites in 16 countries, predominantly in Europe, North America, Africa and Asia. The group supplies its products to numerous multinational corporations and local market leaders in the food, pet food, pharmaceuticals and beverage industries.

History 
Constantia Flexibles is a corporate group with roots in Constantia Teich and Haendler & Natermann in Europe.

Constantia Teich 
Brothers Richard and Ernest Teich founded the company “Teich OHG” in Weinburg, Austria in 1912 and began rolling tin and lead sheeting with 4 employees. The first aluminum band rolling stands were constructed in 1927; flexographic printing was incorporated into the production program in 1952/53 and the intaglio printing process in 1962.

Haendler & Natermann 
Haendler & Natermann was founded in 1825 as a carrier company in Hann. Münden, Germany. Lead sheets and lead foil were manufactured on an industrial scale in 1840, e.g. for tea chests and snuff boxes.

Products 
The company manufactures flexible packaging in the form of thin and flexible plastic and cellophane sheets, aluminum sheets and paper. These are used on their own or in combination, in direct and indirect primary & secondary packaging for food and non-food products, in retail, in industrial applications as well as in the health sector.

Corporate structure 
The management at Constantia Flexibles is made up of the Management Board and the Executive Committee. The Management Board includes recently appointed Chief Executive Officer Pim Vervaat, Chief Financial Officer Richard Kelsey.
Funds advised by One Equity Partners (OEP) and the H. Turnauer Foundation have come to an agreement with the Wendel Group to sell their 100% share in Constantia Flexibles. The Wendel offer values Constantia Flexibles at around EUR 2.3 billion (Enterprise Value). The H. Turnauer Foundation intends to remain a significant shareholder in Constantia Flexibles and is currently in talks with the Wendel Group regarding a potential reinvestment. 
The transaction is subject to approval from the responsible competition authorities. This is expected to be completed in the first half of 2015.

In 2017, Constantia Flexibles sold its Labels division to Multi-Color Corporation for a value of approximately $1.3 billion. Following the transaction, Constantia became the owner of 16.6% of Multi Color's outstanding shares.

Locations 
The Constantia Flexibles headquarters are located in the Rivergate Building in Vienna with around 130 employees. Constantia Teich GmbH, headquartered in Weinburg, is one of the largest production facilities at Constantia Flexibles with approximately 900 employees.

References

External links 
 

Austrian companies established in 2004
Manufacturing companies based in Vienna
Packaging companies of Austria